This list of locomotive depots (Bahnbetriebswerke) in Germany includes all those within the borders of the Deutsches Reich in 1937, which were at sometime between 1920 and 1994 independent facilities. They are grouped by the divisions (Direktionen) that existed in 1994, with the exception of those divisions east of the Oder-Neisse line. The year when they were closed as independent depots is given in brackets after the name. For a list of currently active locomotive depots in Germany see the List of Deutsche Bahn locomotive depots.

Berlin Division 

Bw Basdorf · Bw Berlin-Anhalter Bahnhof · Bw Berlin-Gesundbrunnen · Bw Berlin-Grunewald · Bw Berlin-Grünau · Bw Berlin-Hundekehle · Bw Berlin-Lehrter Bahnhof · Bw Berlin-Lichtenberg · Bw Berlin-Nordbahnhof · Bw Berlin-Pankow · Bw Berlin-Papestraße · Bw Berlin-Potsdamer Güterbahnhof · Bw Berlin-Rummelsburg · Bw Berlin-Schlesischer Gbf · Bw Berlin-Schöneweide Vbf · Bw Berlin-Tempelhof Vbf · Bw Berlin-Wannsee · Bw Cottbus · Bw Elsterwerda · Bw Erkner · Bw Forst · Bw Frankfurt (Oder) Pbf · Bw Frankfurt (Oder) Vbf · Bw Guben · Bw Hoyerswerda · Bw Jüterbog · Bw Luckau · Bw Lübbenau · Bw Muskau · Bw Potsdam · Bw Seddin · Bw Senftenberg · Bw Straupitz · Bw Wriezen · Bw Wustermark Vbf

Breslau Division 

Bw Breslau Hbf · Bw Breslau-Freiburger Bf · Bw Breslau-Mochbern · Bw Brockau · Bw Brieg · Bw Königszelt · Bw Glatz · Bw Strehlen · Bw Kamenz · Bw Oels · Bw Schweidnitz · Bw Liegnitz · Bw Arnsdorf · Bw Sagan · Bw Sommerfeld · Bw Kohlfurt · Bw Hirschberg Hbf · Bw Lauban · Bw Schlauroth · Bw Waldenburg-Dittersbach · Bw Trautenau

Dresden Division 

Bw Adorf · Bw Arnsdorf · Bw Aue · Bw Bautzen · Bw Bischofswerda · Bw Buchholz · Bw Dresden-Altstadt · Bw Dresden-Friedrichstadt · Bw Dresden-Pieschen · Bw Chemnitz Hbf · Bw Chemnitz-Hilbersdorf · Bw Döbeln · Bw Falkenstein · Bw Flöha · Bw Freiberg · Bw Glauchau · Bw Görlitz · Bw Kamenz · Bw Löbau · Bw Mügeln · Bw Nossen · Bw Pirna · Bw Pockau-Lengefeld · Bw Reichenbach · Bw Riesa · Bw Rochlitz · Bw Bad Schandau · Bw Schwarzenberg · Bw Werdau · Bw Wilsdruff · Bw Zittau · Bw Zwickau

Erfurt Division 

Bw Arnstadt (um 1993) · Bw Eisenach (2004) · Bw Erfurt · Bw Gera · Bw Gerstungen (1952) · Bw Gotha (1974) · Bw Meiningen (DB: 1999) · Bw Nordhausen · Bw Probstzella · Bw Saalfeld · Bw Suhl · Bw Vacha (1974) · Bw Sonneberg · Bw Sangerhausen · Bw Weißenfels

Essen Division 

To 1974 partly in Elberfeld Division (from 1930: Wuppertal)

Bw Altenhundem (1966) · Bw Arnsberg (1953) · Bw Bestwig (1982) · Bw Betzdorf (1982) · Bw Bielefeld (1985) · Bw Bocholt (1953) · Bw Bochum-Dahlhausen (1969) · Bw Bochum-Langendreer (1966) · Bw Bochum Nord (1954) · Bw Brügge (1953) · Bw Coesfeld (1951) · Bw Dortmund Bbf · Bw Dortmunderfeld (1960) ·Bw Dortmund Rbf (1982) · Bw Dortmund Süd (1953) · Bw Duisburg Hbf (1966) · Bw Duisburg-Wedau (1977) · Bw Duisburg-Ruhrort Hafen (1966) · Bw Erndtebrück (1963) · Bw Essen Hbf (1986) · Bw Essen Nord (1961) · Bw Finnentrop (1976) · Bw Fröndenberg (1954) · Bw Gelsenkirchen-Bismarck (1982) · Bw Gelsenkirchen Hbf (1951) · Bw Gronau(1957) · Bw Gütersloh (1969) · Bw Hagen-Eckesey · Bw Hagen Gbf (1968) · Bw Hagen-Vorhalle (1966) · Bw Haltern (1967)) · Bw Hamm · Bw Hattingen (1951) · Bw Herford (1954) · Bw Herne (1953) · Bw Holzwickede (1954) · Bw Kettwig (1953) · Bw Kreuztal (1953) · Bw Kupferdreh (1953) · Bw Letmathe (1960) · Bw Mülheim-Speldorf (1953) · Bw Mülheim-Styrum (1954) · Bw Münster (1985) · Bw Oberhausen Hbf (1978) · Bw Oberhausen-Osterfeld Süd · Bw Oberhausen West (1959) · Bw Olpe (1953) · Bw Paderborn (1983) · Bw Recklinghausen Hbf (1970) · Bw Siegen · Bw Soest (1967) · Bw Schwerte (1966) · Bw Wanne-Eickel · Bw Wesel (1966) · Bw Witten (1953)

Frankfurt (Main) Division 

Bw Alzey (1952) · Bw Bebra · Bw Bingerbrück (1965) · Bw Darmstadt-Hbf · Bw Darmstadt-Kranichstein (1960) · Bw Dillenburg (1984) · Bw Elm(1951) · Bw Eschwege-West (1974) · Bw Frankenberg (1956) · Bw Frankfurt 1 · Bw Frankfurt 2 · Bw Frankfurt 3 (1958) · Bw Frankfurt-Griesheim (1967) · Bw Frankfurt-Ost (1960) · Bw Friedberg (1982) · Bw Fulda · Bw Gießen · Bw Hanau (1982) · Bw Kassel · Bw Limburg · Bw Mainz-Bischofsheim (1984) · Bw Mainz-Hbf (1990) · Bw Marburg (1983) · Bw Offenbach (1958) · Bw Treysa (1967) · Bw Weinheim (1958) · Bw Wetzlar (1962) · Bw Wiesbaden (1981) · Bw Worms (1984)

Halle (Saale) Division 

Bw Altenburg · Bw Bitterfeld · Bw Dessau · Bw Eilenburg · Bw Engelsdorf · Bw Falkenberg (Elster) · Bw Großkorbetha · Bw Halle G · Bw Halle Klaustor · Bw Halle P · Bw Leipzig Bayer Bf · Bw Leipzig Hbf Nord · Bw Leipzig Hbf Süd · Bw Leipzig Hbf West · Bw Leipzig-Plagwitz · Bw Leipzig-Wahren · Bw Merseburg · Bw Meuselwitz · Bw Röblingen am See (1992) · Bw Roßlau · Bw Torgau · Bw Wittenberg · Bw Zeitz

Hamburg Division 

Bw Buchholz (Kreis Harburg) (1980) · Bw Cuxhaven (1960) · Bw Flensburg · Bw Hamburg-Altona (1983) · Bw Hamburg-Berlinertor (1966) · Bw Hamburg-Eidelstedt · Bw Hamburg-Harburg (1980) · Bw Hamburg-Ohlsdorf · Bw Hamburg-Rothenburgsort (1972) · Bw Hamburg-Wilhelmsburg · Bw Heide (1953) · Bw Heiligenhafen (1963) · Bw Husum (1986) · Bw Itzehoe (1963) · Bw Kiel · Bw Lübeck · Bw Lüneburg (1960) · Bw Neumünster (1970) · Bw Puttgarden (1982) · Bw Rendsburg (1954)

Hannover Division 

Bw Altenbeken · Bw Börßum (1958) · Bw Bremen Hbf · Bw Bremen Rbf (1984) · Bw Bremen Walle (1957) · Bw Bremerhaven Geestemünde (1966) · Bw Bremerhaven (Lehe) · Bw Braunschweig Hbf (1960) · Bw Braunschweig Vbf · Bw Celle (1964) · Bw Delmenhorst (1973) · Bw Emden · Bw Göttingen Pbf · Bw Göttingen Vbf (1965) · Bw Goslar (1972) · Bw Hameln (1982) ·Bw Hannover Hbf · Bw Hannover Hgbf (1968) · Bw Hannover Linden (1965) ·  Bw Helmstedt (1967) · Bw Hildesheim (1986) ·Bw Holzminden (1978) ·  Bw Kirchweyhe (1968) · Bw Kreiensen (1963) · Bw Löhne (1984) · Bw Lehrte (1976) · Bw Minden (1969) · Bw Nienburg (Weser) (1973) · Bw Norden (1953) · Bw Nordenham (1983) · Bw Nordstemmen (1951) · Bw Northeim (1978) · Bw Oldenburg Hbf · Bw Oldenburg Vbf (1967) · Bw Osnabrück Hbf · Bw Osnabrück Rbf (1967) · Bw Ottbergen (1976) · Bw Rahden (1978) · Bw Rheine (1983) · Bw Scherfede (1950) · Bw Seelze · Bw Seesen (1954) · Bw Soltau (1960) · Bw Uelzen (1982) · Bw Wangerooge · Bw Warburg (1959) · Bw Wilhelmshaven (1961) · Bw Wunstorf (1951)

Karlsruhe Division 

Bw Basel Bad (1957) · Bw Bruchsal (1958) · Bw Freiburg · Bw Heidelberg (1989) · Bw Haltingen · Bw Karlsruhe Hbf · Bw Karlsruhe Rbf (1960) · Bw Konstanz (1968) · Bw Landau (1983) · Bw Ludwigshafen (1986) · Bw Mannheim Hbf (1954) · Bw Mannheim Rbf · Bw Neckarelz (1954) · Bw Neustadt (1958) · Bw Offenburg · Bw Radolfzell (1985) · Bw Singen · Bw Villingen (1977) · Bw Waldshut (1967)

Cologne Division 

To 1974 partly in Elberfeld Division (from 1930: Wuppertal)

Bw Aachen-Hbf (1963) · Bw Aachen-West · Bw Altenkirchen (1979) · Bw Bensberg (1951) · Bw Bergheim (1961) · Bw Bonn (1960) · Bw Düsseldorf Abstellbahnhof, Bw Düsseldorf-Derendorf (1981) · Bw Düsseldorf-Hbf · Bw Dieringhausen(1982) · Bw Düren (1983) · Bw Engers (1957) · Bw Euskirchen (1966) · Bw Geldern (1967) · Bw Gremberg · Bw Herzogenrath (1950) · Bw Hohenbudberg (1983) · Bw Jülich (1959) · Bw Jünkerath (1966) · Bw Kleve (1963) · Bw Köln-Bbf (1964) · Bw Köln-Deutzerfeld · Bw Köln-Eifeltor (1973) · Bw Köln-Kalk Nord (1959) · Bw Köln-Nippes (1990) · Bw Koblenz-Lützel (1968) · Bw Koblenz-Mosel (1988) · Bw Krefeld (1992) · Bw Kreuzberg (1959) · Bw Linz (1954) · Bw Mayen (1983) · Bw Mönchengladbach · Bw Neuss (1975) · Bw Niederlahnstein (1951) · Bw Oberlahnstein (1962) · Bw Opladen (1960) · Bw Ratingen-West (1951) · Bw Remscheid-Lennep (1960) · Bw Rheydt (1975) · Bw Solingen-Ohligs (1950) · Bw Stolberg (1976) · Bw Würselen (1950) · Bw Wuppertal-Langerfeld (1964) · Bw Wuppertal-Steinbeck · Bw Wuppertal-Vohwinkel (1971)

Königsberg Division 

Bw Königsberg · Bw Korschen · Bw Insterburg · Bw Tilsit · Bw Eydtkau · Bw Memel · Bw Allenstein · Bw Osterode · Bw Scharfenwiese · Bw Lyck · Bw Prostken · Bw Angerburg · Bw Guwalki · Bw Mohrungen

Nuremberg Division 

Bw Ansbach · Bw Aschaffenburg · Bw Bamberg (ca. 1980) · Bw Bayreuth · Bw Gemünden/Main · Bw Hof · Bw Kirchenlaibach · Bw Lichtenfels · Bw Neuenmarkt-Wirsberg (since 1977 German Steam Locomotive Museum) · Bw Nürnberg West (ehemals Bw Nürnberg Hbf.) · Bw Nürnberg Rbf. · Bw Passau · Bw Plattling · Bw Pressig-Rothenkirchen · Bw Regensburg · Bw Schwandorf · Bw Schweinfurt · Bw Straubing · Bw Weiden · Bw Würzburg

Magdeburg Division 

Bw Aschersleben · Bw Bernburg · Bw Blankenburg (Harz) · Bw Burg (b. Magd) (Schmalspur-Bw) · Bw Eilsleben · Bw Güsten · Bw Halberstadt (2003) · Bw Haldensleben · Bw Jerichow · Bw Köthen · Bw Magdeburg Hbf · Bw Magdeburg-Buckau · Bw Magdeburg-Rothensee · Bw Oebisfelde · Bw Oschersleben · Bw Salzwedel · Bw Staßfurt · Bw Stendal · Bw Wernigerode (Schmalspur-Bw)

Munich Division 

Bw Augsburg · Bw Berchtesgaden (1966) · Bw Buchloe (1960) · Bw Freilassing · Bw Garmisch-Partenkirchen (1984) · Bw Ingolstadt · Bw Kempten · Bw Landshut (1984) · Bw Lindau (1983) · Bw Mühldorf · Bw München Hbf · Bw München-Ludwigsfeld (1953) · Bw München-Ost (1977) · Bw München-Steinhausen · Bw München-Thalkirchen (1952) · Bw Murnau (1950) · Bw Neu-Ulm (1961) · Bw Nördlingen (1983) · Bw Oberstdorf (1951) · Bw Rosenheim (1989) · Bw Schongau (1967) · Bw Simbach (1959) · Bw Treuchtlingen (1968)

Oppeln Division 

Bw Gleiwitz · Bw Beuthen · Bw Peiskretscham · Bw Groschowitz · Bw Oppeln · Bw Neiße · Bw Nieder-Lindewiese · Bw Jägerndorf · Bw Troppau · Bw Zauchtel

Osten Division 

Bw Küstrin-Neustadt · Bw Landsberg (Warthe) · Bw Meseritz · Bw Schneidemühl Pbf · Bw Schneidemühl Bbf · Bw Kreuz · Bw Arnswalde · Bw Neu Bentschen · Bw Glogau · Bw Grünberg

Saarbrücken Division 

Bw Cochem (1966) · Bw Dillingen (1973) · Bw Ehrang (1983) · Bw Gerolstein (1977) · Bw Hermeskeil (1955) · Bw Homburg (1967) · Bw Kaiserslautern · Bw Kirn (1966) · Bw Merzig (1957) · Bw Neunkirchen (1958) · Bw Saarbrücken Hbf · Bw Saarbrücken Vbf (1964) · Bw Simmern (1982) · Bw St. Wendel (1981) · Bw Trier · Bw Völklingen (1959) · Bw Zweibrücken (1962)

Schwerin Division 

Bw Angermünde · Bw Barth · Bw Eberswalde · Bw Friedland · Bw Güstrow · Bw Hagenow Land · Bw Heringsdorf · Bw Neubrandenburg · Bw Neuruppin · Bw Neustrelitz · Bw Parchim · Bw Pasewalk · Bw Prenzlau · Bw Rostock . Bw Rostock-Seehafen · Bw Saßnitz · Bw Schwerin · Bw Stralsund · Bw Wismar · Bw Wittenberge · Bw Wittstock (Dosse)

Stuttgart Division 

Bw Aalen (1976) · Bw Calw (1953) · Bw Crailsheim (1987) · Bw Freudenstadt (1977) · Bw Friedrichshafen (1982) · Bw Geislingen (1958) · Bw Heilbronn · Bw Horb (?) Bw Kornwestheim · Bw Lauda (1976) · Bw Mühlacker (1952) · Bw Plochingen · Bw Pforzheim (1978) · Bw Rottweil (1978) · Bw Stuttgart Rosensteinpark · Bw Stuttgart-Untertürkheim (1953) · Bw Tübingen · Bw Ulm

Stettin Division 

Bw Stettin Gbf · Bw Stettin Hbf · Bw Jädickendorf · Bw Swinemünde · Bw Stargard · Bw Belgard · Bw Kolberg · Bw Naugard · Bw Bad Polzin · Bw Pyritz · Bw Stolp · Bw Neustettin · Bw Lauenburg · Bw Bütow

See also
History of rail transport in Germany
Bahnbetriebswerk
Bahnbetriebswerk (steam locomotives)
 List of Deutsche Bahn locomotive depots

Rail infrastructure in Germany
 
Loco